Dino Hotić (born 26 July 1995) is a professional footballer who plays as an attacking midfielder for Belgian First Division A club Cercle Brugge. Born in Slovenia, he represents the Bosnia and Herzegovina national team.

Hotić started his professional career at Maribor, who loaned him to Veržej in 2013 and to Krško in 2016. In 2020, he joined Cercle Brugge.

A former Slovenian youth international, Hotić made his senior international debut for Bosnia and Herzegovina in 2019.

Club career

Early career
Hotić started playing football at local club Domžale and later at Bravo, before joining Maribor's youth academy in 2011.

In July 2013, he was sent on a season-long loan to Veržej. In January 2016, he was loaned to Krško until the end of season.

Cercle Brugge
In January 2020, Hotić was transferred to Belgian outfit Cercle Brugge for an undisclosed fee, reported to be around €1.2 million. He made his official debut for the team on 19 January against Antwerp. On 8 February, he scored his first goal for Cercle Brugge in a triumph over Mechelen.

International career
Despite representing Slovenia at all youth levels, Hotić decided to play for Bosnia and Herzegovina at senior level as his parents are of Bosnian descent from Ključ.

In October 2019, his request to change sports citizenship from Slovenian to Bosnian was approved by FIFA. Later that month, he received his first senior call-up, for the UEFA Euro 2020 qualifying matches against Italy and Liechtenstein. He debuted against the latter on 18 November.

Career statistics

Club

International

Honours
Maribor
Slovenian PrvaLiga: 2011–12, 2012–13, 2013–14, 2014–15, 2016–17, 2018–19
Slovenian Cup: 2011–12, 2012–13
Slovenian Supercup: 2012, 2013, 2014

References

External links

1995 births
Living people
Footballers from Ljubljana
Slovenian people of Bosnia and Herzegovina descent
Citizens of Bosnia and Herzegovina through descent
Slovenian footballers
Slovenia youth international footballers
Slovenia under-21 international footballers
Slovenian expatriate footballers
Bosnia and Herzegovina footballers
Bosnia and Herzegovina international footballers
Bosnia and Herzegovina expatriate footballers
Association football midfielders
NK Maribor players
NK Krško players
Cercle Brugge K.S.V. players
Slovenian PrvaLiga players
Slovenian Second League players
Belgian Pro League players
Expatriate footballers in Belgium
Slovenian expatriate sportspeople in Belgium
Bosnia and Herzegovina expatriate sportspeople in Belgium